Real Madrid is a Puerto Rican soccer team, established in 2009. Its home base is Bayamon, Puerto Rico, and they play at the Juan Ramon Loubriel Stadium and they will play in the Puerto Rico Soccer League in 2010.

Association football clubs established in 2009
Football clubs in Puerto Rico
2009 establishments in Puerto Rico